Artificial rice is a grain product made to resemble rice. It is  usually made from broken rice, sometimes with the addition of other cereals, and often fortified with micronutrients, including minerals  such as iron and zinc and vitamins, such as vitamin A and vitamin B.

Manufacture 

Rice-making machines exist that allow broken rice or other ingredients to be shaped into rice-shaped pellets. Rice fortification presents numerous technical problems. Micronutrients cannot be simply added to the kernels, because they do not stay where they are needed and the traditional soaking and rinsing of rice with water prior to cooking removes most of the added nutrients.

In the hot extrusion process, rice flour and micronutrients are transformed into a product visually resembling natural rice. Thereby, vitamins and minerals are embedded and protected from segregation and from being removed through rinsing or leaching out during washing and cooking.

NutriRice
NutriRice is  a kind of recomposed fortified rice. The NutriRice process is a way of rice fortification utilized hot extrusion technology not only addresses the problem of hidden hunger but also meets the challenge of implementing rice fortification. The production of NutriRice offers the unique possibility to efficiently fortify rice with multiple micronutrients. Vitamins and minerals such as vitamin A and B family as well as iron and zinc can be chosen for inclusion.

Research
With respect to fortified rice properties, such as wash stability, shelf stability, cooking behavior, visual appearance, and cooked rice texture, hot extrusion can be recommended to produce the fortified rice kernel. The fortified rice kernel through hot extrusion most closely resembles natural rice after cooking.

Dandelion Middle School
The children of 600 migrant workers attend the Dandelion Middle School in Beijing, some of them as resident pupils. In 2008, as part of a pilot project, all pupils at the school were given NutriRice for a period of 8 months. During the eight-month trial period, the effects of malnutrition were reduced by 50%, thus raising the pupils’ general nutritional status to the average urban level.

Ultra Rice
Ultra Rice is a grain product made to resemble rice and fortified with vitamins and nutrients. Program for Appropriate Technology in Health (PATH) developed Ultra Rice as a food supplement for use in countries where people do not have easy access to food which satisfies the nutritional requirements for good health.

Manufacture
Ultra Rice was developed by Dr. James P. Cox and his wife Jeanne over a course of 20 years, starting in the 1960s while living in Canada.

Jim and Jeanne's idea was to utilitize the wasted broken rice grains and produce a nutrition-enhanced instant rice product to fight world hunger. The first criteria for feeding the people was to create a nutritious food that could be identified by the indigenous people. Second, the food should be easy to prepare, even in the crudest method on a dung burner, in less than five minutes, all the while maintaining its integrity as a recognized food. The rice should be fortified with protein and contain vitamins A and D.

The process Dr. and Mrs. Cox developed was more expensive to execute than the market value of the product and they eventually transferred their patent for the process to PATH.

Ultra Rice was first made generally available in 2005.

The grains resemble milled rice grains in size, shape, and color, but actually they are made from rice flour, added nutrients, and ingredients which preserve the nutrients.

Use
Most Ultra Rice products are designed for blending with white rice in a ratio of 1:100 and intended to be as close as possible to rice in smell, taste, and texture.

It was originally used in Brazil, Colombia, and India, but through a partnership with World Vision the product is slated to be used in many developing countries receiving aid.

Research
Researchers assessed the stability of Ultra Rice's vitamins as the rice is stored; ascorbate, saturated fat and antioxidants were found to help keep the vitamin A intact during storage in high humidity. Another study found that vitamin A losses would stabilize after six months and that the loss of vitamin A during cooking could be predicted.

A lack of vitamin A can cause night blindness; a study in 2005 showed that 348 pregnant Nepali women who ate Ultra Rice had improvement in night vision which did not different significantly from the improvement which could come from vitamin A as liver, carrots, capsule, or green leafy vegetables.

A ferric pyrophosphate in Ultra Rice was shown in a study involving 180 lactating nonpregnant women in Mexico to reduce iron deficiency anemia rates in the study population by 80% and iron deficiency by 29%.

A taste panel has shown that most people cannot differentiate between ordinary rice and Ultra Rice by taste, and various other reports have shown that there is no statistically significant difference of taste preference between Ultra Rice and rice. In a study on 134 children aged 8–11 years old participating in the Indian Mid-day Meal Scheme, 37 assessed the difference between samples and 43 subjects assessed the acceptability of fortified rice.

Partners
After PATH developed Ultra Rice many other entities began to participate in its manufacture, distributing, and the tracking of its efficacy.

Ultra Rice is usually manufactured within the country using it.

The Department of Biotechnology (India), Ministry of Agriculture (Brazil), Universidade Federal de Viçosa (Brazil), and the University of Toronto (Canada) contributed to the research and development of the Ultra Rice plan.

In India the Akshaya Patra Foundation and the Naandi Foundation implement the Ultra Rice Project. Elsewhere the Global Alliance for Improved Nutrition, World Vision, and World Food Programme created implementation programs.

The Ultra Rice project was funded by the Bill & Melinda Gates Foundation, the United States Department of Agriculture, and the National Institute of Food and Agriculture.

Response
In 2009 The Tech Museum of Innovation recognized PATH for Ultra Rice with an award in recognition of its use of technology to solve major world problems.

Other grains

Corn rice
In North Korea, an artificial "corn rice", known as Okssal (옥쌀) or Gangnagssal (강낭쌀) was made from maize. It is also fairly popular in the Philippines where locals use it as a cheaper substitute for white rice.

Konjac rice 
Konjac rice was developed for low-calorie diet.

Plastic rice rumours
Rice made from plastic and passed off as real rice has sometimes been reported in the media. In India it was mentioned in a case before the high court, but the reports were not confirmed. In December 2016, it was reported that 2.5 tonnes of plastic rice had been seized in Nigeria. A few weeks later, after preliminary tests, a spokesperson of the Nigerian Federal Ministry of Health stated that the material contained all the characteristics of real rice and there was no evidence that plastic rice was circulating in the country; the National Agency for Food and Drug Administration and Control later announced that the seized rice had been contaminated with bacteria. Fake rice was also reported on social media in the Philippines. 
In 2017, there were rumours of plastic rice in the Gambia and Ghana, but these rumours were not confirmed. The Ghana Food and Drugs Authority carried out an investigation and found out samples suspected to be fake rice were not real.

Snopes, a website that investigates urban legends, concluded that such reports were either hoaxes or unproven, pointing out that plastic rice grains would easily be detected after cooking, and probably more expensive to produce than real rice. Reasons suggested for the persistence of such "myths" included protectionism and distrust of foreign imports, with fake videos being deliberately used to support locally grown rice.

See also
 Ptitim, an Israeli wheat pasta developed as a substitute for rice.
 Golden rice, a genetically modified type of rice which requires no processing to add vitamin A (via beta carotene)

References

External links
Ultra Rice

Rice
Imitation foods
Dietary supplements